UK Parliament Week, previously called Parliament Week, is an annual series of events in the United Kingdom that aim to inspire interest in parliament, politics and democracy and encourage young people and the public to engage with the UK’s democratic system and institutions. Initiated in 2011, a week-long programme of events and activities is organised each year by the House of Commons and House of Lords of the Parliament of the United Kingdom in collaboration with hundreds of other organisations around the country including charities, schools, museums and community groups.

History
The inaugural Parliament Week took place in 2011 between 31 October and 6 November with events taking place around the country. Running from 19–23 November, the schedule for 2012 included visits to schools and debates with school children. The third Parliament Week ran from 15–21 November 2013 and included events about women in democracy. Since 2013, the European Parliament has held an entirely separate event for members of national parliaments under the name "European Parliamentary Week".

Parliament Week 2014 took place from 14–20 November. Discussion topics included digital democracy and a social media campaign called "Do Democracy" which aimed to encourage 16- to 24-year-olds to make their views heard in Parliament and other democratic institutions across the UK.

In 2015, Parliament Week was held on 16–22 November and focused on "the future of democracy". It was coordinated with a year-long programme of events called "Parliament in the Making" which celebrated the 750th anniversary of the first English Parliament to include representatives of the towns and cities of England on 20 January 1265, and the 800th anniversary of the sealing of Magna Carta on 15 June 1215.

The official name of the event was changed in 2016 to "UK Parliament Week"  from "Parliament Week". This change was intended to signify the emphasis on delivering events throughout the United Kingdom and to help distinguish it from activities relating to other Parliaments and Assemblies in the UK: the Scottish Parliament, Senedd Cymru and Northern Ireland Assembly. Parliament Week was held on 14–20 November 2016 which saw 280 events take place around the country including a visit to a school by cabinet minister, Chris Skidmore (Minister for the Constitution).

Parliament Week 2017 was held on 13-19 November during which 4,596 events took place across the UK involving 360,000 people. In 2018, Parliament Week was held on 12-18 November. It focused on events celebrating 100 years of women's suffrage in parliamentary elections in the United Kingdom and all men getting the vote. This was coordinated with Parliament's "Vote100" events.

In 2019, Council of British International Schools around the world were encouraged to participate in UK Parliament Week, taking place form 2-8 November. The Church of England and Nottingham Trent University also participated. Over 1.2 million people took part across England, Northern Ireland, Scotland and Wales and in 47 other countries around the world. The 2020 UK Parliament Week, its tenth year, supported Make Your Mark, a British Youth Council campaign providing an opportunity for 11-18 year olds across the UK to vote on policies they would like to introduce or change.

See also
 Civic engagement
 Democracy Day (Canada)
 European Local Democracy Week
 International Day of Democracy

References

External links
 Parliament Week website
 Video: Magna Carta, Simon de Montfort, and the emergence of Parliament UK Parliament
 Video: A brief history of representation in nearly 60 seconds UK Parliament
 Parliament Week: Stories of Democracy The Bodleian Libraries, University of Oxford

Annual events in the United Kingdom